The Nikon Coolpix S800c is the first digital compact camera with Android operating system announced Aug 22, 2012.

Features
Core camera features (sensor, lens) are shared with the Coolpix S6300.

 Android 2.3 OS 
 3.5" OLED touchscreen monitor 
 GPS and Wi-Fi 
 Email, web browsing, music streaming, social networking, Android apps
 CMOS sensor
 Lens-based and electronic Vibration Reduction
 10x optical zoom
 1080p video recording
 SD card storage with SDHC and SDXC support

See also 

 Nikon
 Nikon Coolpix series
 Samsung Galaxy Camera

References

External links 

Nikon Coolpix S800c Nikon

S800c
Android (operating system) devices
Cameras introduced in 2012